The 1961 Washington State Cougars football team was an American football team that represented Washington State University as an independent during the 1961 NCAA University Division football season. In their sixth season under head coach Jim Sutherland, the Cougars compiled a 3–7 record and were outscored 213 to 163.

The team's statistical leaders included Mel Melin with 814 passing yards, George Reed with 489 rushing yards, and Hugh Campbell with 723 receiving yards.

Schedule

Roster

NFL Draft
Three Cougars were selected in the 1962 NFL Draft, which was twenty rounds (280 selections).

References

External links
 Game program: Utah State vs. WSU at Spokane – September 30, 1961
 Game program: Idaho at WSU – October 14, 1961
 Game program: San Jose State vs. WSU at Spokane – October 28, 1961
 Game program: Oregon at WSU – November 11, 1961

Washington State
Washington State Cougars football seasons
Washington State Cougars football